The 2010 FIVB Women's Club World Championship was the 4th edition of the event. It was held at the Al Gharafa Sports Hall in Doha, Qatar from December 15 to 21, 2010. Fenerbahçe were crowned World champions by defeating Brazilian powerhouse Sollys Osasco 3–0 in the final.

Qualification

Pools composition

Squads

Venue

Preliminary round

Pool A

|}

|}

Pool B

|}

|}

Final round

Semifinals

|}

3rd place

|}

Final

|}

Final standing

Awards
MVP:  Katarzyna Skowrońska (Fenerbahçe)
Best Scorer:  Katarzyna Skowrońska (Fenerbahçe)
Best Spiker:  Thaisa Menezes (Osasco)
Best Blocker:  Annerys Vargas (Mirador)
Best Server:  Eda Erdem Dündar (Fenerbahçe)
Best Setter:  Carolina Albuquerque (Osasco)
Best Libero:  Brenda Castillo (Mirador)

External links
Official Website of the 2010 FIVB Women's Club World Championship

2010 FIVB Women's Club World Championship
FIVB Women's Club World Championship
FIVB Women's Club World Championship
FIVB Volleyball Women's Club World Championship
Sports competitions in Doha